The discography of Swedish singer-songwriter Marie Fredriksson consists of eight studio albums, one live album, two compilations, two collaborative albums, two box sets, thirty-eight singles and fifteen music videos. Fredriksson is predominantly known internationally as the lead singer for pop duo Roxette, although she first found success in her native country through her solo albums. Het vind was released in 1984, spawning the top twenty hit "Ännu doftar kärlek". Her second album, Den sjunde vågen, was released in 1986; the same year Roxette released their debut album, Pearls of Passion. In 1987, ... Efter stormen became the first of her four number one albums in Sweden, and was preceded by the title track—her first top ten hit. 

Roxette's international breakthrough – with Look Sharp! (1988) and Joyride (1991) – coincided with a period of solo inactivity for Fredriksson. The non-album single "Sparvöga" was released in 1989, and became both her highest-peaking and highest-selling single to date. Den ständiga resan was released in 1992 and remains her most successful and critically acclaimed solo album. Four music videos were made for the record, all of which were directed by acclaimed Swedish photographer Jonas Åkerlund, who would go on to direct numerous videos for Roxette over the next few years, including ones for 1994's Crash! Boom! Bang! and 1995's greatest hits compilation. She returned to solo work with 1996's I en tid som vår, which produced "Tro"—one of her best-performing solo singles.

Fredriksson returned to Roxette with the release of Have a Nice Day in 1999 and Room Service in 2001. On 11 September 2002, she had an epileptic seizure and collapsed in her bathroom, with the impact of the fall fracturing her cranium. MRI scans later indicated she had a malignant brain tumour in the back of her head, after which she endured several months of chemotherapy and radiation treatment. Her first English-language solo album, The Change, followed in 2004; it consisted mainly of songs written by Fredriksson in the mid-1990s. An album of Swedish covers, Min bäste vän, was released two years later. "Där du andas" was released in 2008, becoming her first and only number one single in Sweden. Roxette reconvened in 2009 for "The Neverending World Tour", and the duo subsequently released several studio albums. Her eighth and final solo album, Nu!, was released in 2013. Fredriksson died on 9 December 2019 due to complications stemming from her 2002 brain tumour diagnosis.

Studio albums

Live albums

Compilations

Collaborative albums

Box sets

Note
 The second disc of Äntligen – Sommarturné consisted of a CD version of the same concert that appeared on disc one (DVD). Due to differences in the two formats (time constraints), these three songs on the DVD disc were excluded from the CD disc.

Singles

Airplay-only singles

As featured artist

Notes

Other songs
Fredriksson has collaborated on songs recorded by numerous other artists. In 1992, she was a featured performer on "Änglamark" by Artister för miljö (Artists for the Environment), a project spearheaded by Anni-Frid Lyngstad which also featured Håkan Hagegård and Tomas Ledin. This single was released in limited quantities. She performed lead vocals on two songs on Totta Näslund's 2001 album Totta: Duetterna: "Ett minne bättre glömt" and "Sommarens sista servitris". She also performed lead vocals on "On a Sunday", a song by Magnus Lindgren on his 2013 album Souls.

Music videos

References

External links

Discographies of Swedish artists